Believe it or Not is the fourth and final album by the Christian trio Nutshell. This was the second album featuring Annie McCaig and Mo McCafferty. A Best of Nutshell compilation was released in 1981, featuring songs from all four of the group's albums.

The final song on the album, "Thief in the Night", was later recorded by Cliff Richard. Paul Field went on to have a successful career as a singer-songwriter, but particularly as a songwriter. Cliff Richard recorded a number of his songs, including "The Millennium Prayer".

Annie McCaig and Mo McCafferty went on to have successful careers as backing vocalists.

Track listing

Side one
 "Better Take Another Look" (Paul Field/Mo McCafferty)
 "Empty Page" (Paul Field}
 "Looking for Love" (Paul Field)
 "Goin' Nowhere" (Paul Field/Mo McCafferty)
 "Redeemed" (Paul Field)

Side two
 "First Stone" (Paul Field/Mo McCafferty)
 "Night Flight" (Paul Field)
 "Without Love" (Turner/Mo McCafferty)
 "Hard to Say Goodnight" (Paul Field)
 "Thief in the Night" (Paul Field)

Personnel
Paul Field - vocals, guitar, piano
Annie McCaig - vocals
Mo McCafferty - vocals
Mike Giles - drums
John Gustafson - bass
Kevin Peek - guitar
Dave Martin - guitar
Rod Edwards - piano, keyboards
Morris Pert - percussion
Chris Mercer - saxophone
Gordon Giltrap - guitar
Tony Carr - saxophone
Eric Clapton - harmonicas

Production notes
Produced by Jon Miller, Rod Edwards and Roger Hand
Engineered by Roger Wake
Recorded at Redan Recorders, Queensway, London

1979 albums
Nutshell (band) albums